Dover is a small town in Pope County, Arkansas, United States. The population was 1,378 at the 2010 census. Dover is located in the Arkansas River Valley, and is part of the Russellville Micropolitan Statistical Area. Seven miles north of the county seat, Russellville, it has several churches, a grocery store, emergency services—a volunteer fire department and a county EMS substation—, a branch library, schools, two discount variety stores, a medical clinic, a bank, a hardware store, several small eating establishments, and other businesses.

History

Dover was either named by British aristocrats in the 1830s for Dover, Kent, England or by Stephen Rye in 1832 for Dover, Tennessee. Incorporated December 31, 1852, Dover was the county seat for Pope County from 1841 to 1887 with the county's brick courthouse on the square bounded by present-day Camp, Market, Water, and Elizabeth Streets. 

More than half of the businesses in the commercial part of town were lost to fire on February 15, 1930, as were at least 8 homes on two city blocks. At least 11 businesses were lost or badly damaged. A fire truck from neighboring Russellville helped in fighting the fire, but with no municipal fire water system, the truck had to draw water from a large well at a Dover business. Fighting the blaze, thought to have originated as a grass fire, was hampered by the lack of a water supply and high winds.  The buildings lost were of wood frame construction.

The Simmons massacre 
On December 22 and 26, 1987, Ronald Gene Simmons, of near Dover, killed all fourteen members of his family during a Christmas reunion at the Simmons property 5 miles north of Dover. Two days later, he continued his killing spree in the county seat of Russellville, having targeted previous employers and co-workers, killing two and wounding two more. Simmons was arrested without resistance, was sentenced to death on December 10, 1989, waived mandatory appellate review, and executed on June 25, 1990, the quickest sentence-to-execution time in the United States since the death penalty was reinstated in 1976.

Geography 
Dover is located at  (35.400597, -93.112534).

Ecologically, Dover is located within the Arkansas Valley Hills subregion within the larger Arkansas Valley ecoregion. The subregion is a thin transition area between the flat and fertile Arkansas Valley Plains to the south along the Arkansas River, and the steep and densely forested lands of the Boston Mountains in northern Pope County.

The mild hills historically supported oak-hickory forest or oak-hickory-pine forest. Elevation changes and soil types make the Arkansas Valley Hills largely unsuitable for row agriculture. Instead, forest has been cleared for pastureland, poultry farming or ranching. Logging remains an important land use where elevation or soil makes livestock farming unsuitable. Many of the smaller streams and watercourses are completely dry in summer.

Demographics 

As of the census of 2000, there were 1,329 people, 529 households, and 372 families residing in the city. The racial makeup of the city was 97.37% White, 0.23% Black or African American, 0.68% Native American, 0.15% Asian, 0.60% from other races, and 0.98% from two or more races. 1.96% of the population were Hispanic or Latino of any race.

There were 529 households, out of which 37.4% had children under the age of 18 living with them, 48.6% were married couples living together, 16.6% had a female householder with no husband present, and 29.5% were non-families. 26.8% of all households were made up of individuals, and 14.2% had someone living alone who was 65 years of age or older. The average household size was 2.50 and the average family size was 3.01.

In the city, the population was spread out, with 29.3% under the age of 18, 10.2% from 18 to 24, 28.1% from 25 to 44, 18.6% from 45 to 64, and 13.8% who were 65 years of age or older. The median age was 32 years. For every 100 females, there were 79.8 males. For every 100 females age 18 and over, there were 79.0 males.

The median income for a household in the city was $27,697, and the median income for a family was $33,879. Males had a median income of $25,625 versus $19,073 for females. The per capita income for the city was $13,261. About 10.6% of families and 14.6% of the population were below the poverty line, including 13.9% of those under age 18 and 14.0% of those age 65 or over.

Government

Dover operates within the mayor-city council form of government. The mayor is elected by a citywide election to serve as the Chief Executive Officer (CEO) of the city by presiding over all city functions, policies, rules and laws. Once elected, the mayor also allocates duties to city employees. The Dover mayoral election in coincidence with the United States midterm elections. Mayors serve four-year terms and can serve unlimited terms. The city council is the unicameral legislature of the city, consisting of six council members. Also included in the council's duties is balancing the city's budget and passing ordinances.

Education
Primary and secondary education is provided by the Dover School District, which leads to graduation from Dover High School.

Notable people 

 Jeff Davis, 20th Governor of Arkansas (1901-1907), later a US Senator (1907-1913). Davis was known for demagoguery and fiery rhetoric to appeal to his agrarian political base while disparaging city dwellers, blacks and Yankees
 Trevor Drown, Republican member of the Arkansas House of Representatives for Pope and Van Buren counties since 2015; succeeded Robert Dale 
 Kevin Hern, Republican member of the U.S. House of Representatives representing Oklahoma's 1st district since 2018
 Nik and Sam, country music duo
 Ronald Gene Simmons, retired United States Air Force master sergeant who killed sixteen people over a weeklong period in 1987, beginning in Dover

References 

Cities in Arkansas
Cities in Pope County, Arkansas
Russellville, Arkansas micropolitan area
Populated places established in 1832
1832 establishments in the United States